"I'll Be" is a song written by Diane Warren, and recorded by American country music artist Reba McEntire.  It was released in March 2000 as the second single from her album So Good Together.  The song reached #4 on the Billboard Hot Country Singles & Tracks chart in July 2000.

Chart performance

Year-end charts

References

2000 singles
1999 songs
Reba McEntire songs
Songs written by Diane Warren
Song recordings produced by Tony Brown (record producer)
MCA Nashville Records singles
Music videos directed by Deaton-Flanigen Productions